Beckum may refer to:

 Beckum, Germany, a town in Germany
 Beckum, Overijssel, a village in the Netherlands